Notoxus nuperus is a species of monoceros beetle in the family Anthicidae. It is found in Central America and North America.

Subspecies
These two subspecies belong to the species Notoxus nuperus:
 Notoxus nuperus haustrus Chandler, 1978
 Notoxus nuperus nuperus Horn, 1884

References

Further reading

 
 

Anthicidae
Articles created by Qbugbot
Beetles described in 1884